Astathes perplexa is a species of beetle in the family Cerambycidae. It was described by Newman in 1842. It is known from the Philippines. It contains the varietas Astathes perplexa var. mniszechii.

References

P
Beetles described in 1842